Tetyushsky (masculine), Tetyushskaya (feminine), or Tetyushksoye (neuter) may refer to:
Tetyushsky District, a district of the Republic of Tatarstan, Russia
Tetyushskoye, a rural locality (a selo) in Ulyanovsk Oblast, Russia